Siphonotidae is a family of millipedes in the order Polyzoniida. There are about 15 genera and at least 40 described species in Siphonotidae.

Genera

Orsilochus is a taxonomic synonym of Rhinotus.

References

Further reading

 
 
 
 

Polyzoniida
Millipede families